Bringhurst Field was from 1933 to 2013 a baseball stadium in Alexandria, Louisiana.  Owned by the city of Alexandria, it served as the home field of the Alexandria Aces, one of the most successful independent league baseball teams, which won various championships in 1997, 1998, 2006, 2007, and 2009. It also hosted local high school games. Built in 1933 and renovated extensively in 1994, it held 3,500 people. It was the home field for a local high school, the Bolton High School Bears.

For many years the ballpark hosted the Louisiana High School Baseball Championships and the Louisiana High School All-Star Game. Alexandria Zoological Park is situated behind the left field wall.

Amenities included a two-room press box, two picnic areas, two separate clubhouses for home and visiting teams, deck seating for sponsors, and electric fans to cool the rooters sitting in the wooden seating areas, which are not individual seats but rather a long wooden stairway extending behind the boxes.

Bringhurst closed after eighty years of use in 2013 because of safety concerns about the metal superstructure that supported the wooden bleachers. The Alexandria Aces still used the field in 2014 but failed to complete the season, and a fire in 2014 destroyed the former clubhouse and office. The outfield wall, which had been coming apart in pieces, and the scoreboard are being removed. The field will become a green space in June 2017 for picnicking and playing leisure games.

The field was named in honor of Alexandria engineer Robert Wilton Bringhurst (1840-1912), who built bridges during the American Civil War.

Gallery

References

Baseball venues in Louisiana
Sports venues in Alexandria, Louisiana
Minor league baseball venues
Demolished sports venues in Louisiana
Sports venues completed in 1933